The II Royal Bavarian Reserve Corps / II Bavarian RK was a corps level command of the Royal Bavarian Army, part of the German Army during World War I. The corps only existed for a few months before the Staff was used to form a new Staff for the South Army on the Eastern Front.

History 
In peacetime, the German Army only conscripted about half of those eligible to serve, as the population was too numerous for its establishment. The remainder were posted to the Landsturm or the Ersatz Reserve.

At the outbreak of the War, a large number of volunteers flocked to the colours. In October 1914, these formed the XXII - XXVII Reserve Corps (43rd - 54th Reserve Divisions) plus the 6th Bavarian Reserve Division). Similarly, in December 1914, a second wave of corps (XXXVIII - XXXXI Reserve Corps) and divisions (75th - 82nd Reserve Divisions along with 8th Bavarian Reserve Division) was formed. The personnel predominantly comprised kriegsfreiwillige (wartime volunteers) who did not wait to be called up.

In keeping with the then normal practice of two divisions forming a corps, the II Royal Bavarian Reserve Corps was formed in December 1914. It was commanded by General der Infanterie Felix Graf von Bothmer, who was brought out of retirement.  The Corps was renamed as Corps Bothmer on 22 March 1915.  The Corps had a relatively brief existence: on 7 July 1915, the headquarters was upgraded to that of South Army on the Eastern Front when the original command was transformed into the Army of the Bug.

Commanders 
II Bavarian Reserve Corps was commanded throughout its existence by General der Infanterie Felix Graf von Bothmer.

See also 

Bavarian Army
6th Bavarian Reserve Division
8th Bavarian Reserve Division
South Army

Notes

References

Bibliography 
 
 
 
 
 

Corps of Germany in World War I
Military units and formations of Bavaria
1914 establishments in Germany
1915 disestablishments in Germany
Military units and formations established in 1914
Military units and formations disestablished in 1915